Anastatic lithography is a method of printing developed by 1840 in Erfurt.  The technique provided a means for facsimile reproduction, which was developed and promoted by Werner and William Siemens. Whereas the reproduction of the four pages of the 25th September 1841 issue of The Athenaeum, a London scientific journal, was so true to the original that it caused concerns expressed in an article "Printing and Piracy-New Discovery" which was published in the issue No. 736 published December 4, 1841.

See also
 Bibliography of early American publishers and printers

References

History of printing